The 2005–06 Superliga season was be the 18th since its establishment. Espanyol won its first title ever.

Before the start of the competition, Sabadell withdrew from the league.

Teams and locations

League table

Results

See also
 2006 Copa de la Reina de Fútbol

References

 Season on soccerway

2005-06
Spa
1
women